Peter Gerard Hendy, Baron Hendy of Richmond Hill  (born 19 March 1953) is a British transport executive and politician. He is the current chairman of Network Rail and was formerly the Commissioner of Transport for London.

Education
Hendy was educated at Latymer Upper School and the University of Leeds, where he graduated in Economics and Geography in 1975.

Career

London Transport
Hendy started his career in the public transport industry in 1975 as a London Transport graduate trainee. He moved up the career ladder, eventually taking on the role of managing director of CentreWest London Buses Ltd, managing it under London Transport ownership.

First Bus
He led the company through a management buyout with staff involvement, and subsequent expansion. After the takeover of CentreWest by FirstGroup, Hendy became Deputy Director UK Bus for FirstGroup, responsible for bus operations in London and southern England, bus development, light rail and operations in Hong Kong.

Transport for London
In 2001, he was appointed to the position of managing director of Surface Transport for Transport for London (TfL), under Ken Livingstone's mayoralty of London. On 1 February 2006, he took up the position of Commissioner of Transport for London. He continued in post after the election of Boris Johnson as Mayor of London in 2008.

Network Rail
In July 2015 he was appointed chair of Network Rail by the then Secretary of State for Transport, Patrick McLoughlin.

London Legacy Development Corporation 
In July 2017 he was appointed chair of the London Legacy Development Corporation, by the Mayor of London Sadiq Khan, which is developing the Queen Elizabeth Olympic Park.

Science Museum Group 
In July 2019 he was appointed by the then Prime Minister Theresa May as a trustee of the Science Museum Group which incorporates the National Railway Museum in York.

London Transport Museum 
Hendy is also an independent trustee of the London Transport Museum.

Union Connectivity Review 
He was appointed chair of the Union Connectivity Review.  It was announced on 30 June 2020 and the terms of reference were published 3 October 2020. It was published November 2021.

Honours

Hendy was appointed Commander of the Order of the British Empire (CBE) in the 2006 New Year Honours "for services to Public Transport and to the community in London." Following the successful operation of transport during the 2012 Olympic and Paralympic Games he was knighted for services to transport and the community in the 2013 New Year Honours. Hendy was given an Award of Doctor of Science honoris causa by City University London in 2010, an honorary Doctor of Engineering by the University of Bath in 2014, an honorary Doctor of Laws by the University of Leeds in 2015 and an honorary Doctor of Letters by Queen Mary University London in 2018.

It was announced on 14 October 2022, that as part of the 2022 Special Honours, Hendy would receive a life peerage. On 17 November 2022, Hendy was created Baron Hendy of Richmond Hill, of Imber in the County of Wiltshire.

Personal life

Hendy is the younger son of Jack Hendy and the Honourable Mary Best, youngest daughter of Philip George Best, 6th Baron Wynford. He is married to Sue Pendle, a human resources consultant; the couple, who live in Richmond, London have two children. His brother is John Hendy, Baron Hendy KC.

Hendy owns two roadworthy London AEC Routemaster buses. He is organiser of the 23A scheduled bus service which runs once a year to the isolated and abandoned Wiltshire village of Imber which is surrounded by military firing ranges on Salisbury Plain and is normally closed to the public. In 2019, 28 double-decker buses operated the route at 15-minute intervals from Warminster station.

References

External links
Official Network Rail web page of Board members
Appointment as Commissioner of Transport
Interview with 'The Guardian' on his first day as Commissioner of Transport

1953 births
Living people
Alumni of the University of Leeds
Commanders of the Order of the British Empire
Crossbench life peers
Knights Bachelor
People associated with transport in London
People educated at Latymer Upper School
People from London
People in bus transport
Place of birth missing (living people)
Life peers created by Charles III